Gaden is a surname. Notable people with the surname include:

Alexander Gaden (born 1880), Canadian silent film actor
Elmer L. Gaden, American biochemist and pioneer of biochemical engineering
John Gaden (born 1941), Australian actor and director

See also
Ganden Monastery, a Tibetan monastery, sometimes referred to as Gaden